Perittia eremonoma is a moth of the family Elachistidae described by Annette Frances Braun in 1948. It is found in the United States from Oregon, Utah, Nebraska and Colorado to California.

The length of the forewings is 4-4.5 mm. The forewings are whitish, densely mottled with dark gray tips of scales. The hindwings and underside of the wings are gray.

References

Moths described in 1921
Elachistidae
Moths of North America
Taxa named by Annette Frances Braun